The 1987 Air Canada Cup was Canada's ninth annual national midget 'AAA' hockey championship, which was played in April 1987 at the Earl Armstrong Arena in Gloucester, Ontario.  The Riverains du Richelieu defeated the Notre Dame Hounds to win their first national title. The Calgary Buffaloes won the bronze medal.  Future National Hockey League players competing in this tournament were Rod Brind'Amour, Scott Pellerin, Reggie Savage, Olaf Kölzig, and Stephane Fiset.  Savage, playing for Richelieu, was the tournament's top scorer and named Most Valuable Player.

Teams

Round robin

Standings

Scores

Notre Dame 9 - Gloucester 5
Richelieu 5 - Dartmouth 1
Calgary 4 - Sudbury 2
Gloucester 3 - Dartmouth 2
Richelieu 2 - Notre Dame 1
Sudbury 3 - Gloucester 2
Richelieu 3 - Calgary 2
Notre Dame 7 - Dartmouth 2
Calgary 5 - Gloucester 2
Richelieu 4 - Sudbury 2
Notre Dame 4 - Calgary 0
Dartmouth 6 - Sudbury 5
Richelieu 5 - Gloucester 2
Sudbury 1 - Notre Dame 0
Calgary 5 - Dartmouth 3

Playoffs

Semi-finals
Richelieu 7 - Sudbury 5
Notre Dame 5 - Calgary 4 (2OT)

Bronze-medal game
Calgary 8 - Sudbury 2

Gold-medal game
Richelieu 6 - Notre Dame 2

Individual awards
Most Valuable Player: Reggie Savage (Richelieu)
Top Scorer: Reggie Savage (Richelieu)
Top Forward: Jamie Steer (Calgary)
Top Defenceman: Jason Herter (Notre Dame)
Top Goaltender: Patrick Daigneault (Richelieu)
Most Sportsmanlike Player: David McGahan (Gloucester)

See also
Telus Cup

References

External links
Telus Cup Website
Hockey Canada-Telus Cup Guide and Record Book

Telus Cup
Air Canada Cup
Ice hockey competitions in Ottawa
April 1987 sports events in Canada
1980s in Ottawa
1987 in Ontario